XHBQ-FM 105.3/XEBQ-AM 1240 is a combo radio station in Guaymas, Sonora. It is owned by Grupo Padilla Hermanos and carries a grupera format known as FM 105.

History
XEBQ received its first concession in 1948. It was owned by Raymundo López Lerma. In 1970, Alejandro Padilla Reyes bought XEBQ, and in 1994, it gained an FM combo, XHBQ-FM 105.3.

After Padilla Reyes's death, the Padilla family — Gloria Ruíz Leyva and Gloria Icela, Luis Héctor, Alejandro Alberto, and Mario Padilla Ruiz — inherited the station and organized as GILHAAM, S.A. de C.V. The name GILHAAM, an acronym of the names of the Padilla Ruiz siblings, is also used for another Padilla Hermanos venture, GILHAAM Grupo Funerario, which offers funeral services.

References

Radio stations in Sonora
Radio stations established in 1948